Lelapiidae is a family of calcareous sponges in the order Leucosolenida.

References

Leucosolenida
Taxa named by Arthur Dendy